The Bartolozzi Prize is awarded by the Italian Mathematical Union every two years. Until 2017 it has been awarded to an Italian mathematician below the age of 34. Starting with the 2019 edition the prize has been reserved to female Italian mathematicians below the age of 40. The prize is entitled in the memory of the Italian mathematician  and is worth €3,000 (in 2019).

Further prizes of the Italian Mathematical Union are the Caccioppoli Prize and the Stampacchia Medal.

Prize winners 
Source: Italian Mathematical Union

Winners and relative academic affiliations at the time of the awarding of the prize

1969 Giuseppe Da Prato (Sapienza University of Rome)
1971 Giorgio Talenti (University of Florence)
1973  (University of Pisa)
1975 Maurizio Cornalba (University of Pisa)
1977 Rosario Strano (University of Catania)
1979 Mariano Giaquinta (University of Florence)
1981  (University of Catania)
1983  (University of Pisa)
1985 Daniele C. Struppa (Scuola Normale Superiore di Pisa)
1987 Alessandra Lunardi (University of Pisa)
1989 Marco Abate (Scuola Normale Superiore di Pisa)
1991 Luigi Ambrosio (University of Rome Tor Vergata)
1993 Stefano Demichelis (University of California, San Diego)
1995 Francesco Amoroso (University of Pisa)
1997 Lucia Caporaso (Harvard University)
1999 Marco Manetti (Scuola Normale Superiore di Pisa)
2001 Giovanni Leoni (Carnegie Mellon University)
2003 Carlo Maria Mantegazza (Scuola Normale Superiore di Pisa)
2005 Giuseppe Mingione (University of Parma)
2007 Annalisa Buffa (IMATI, Pavia)
2009  (Columbia University)
2011 not assigned
2013 Gianluca Crippa (University of Basel)
2015 Emanuele Spadaro (Max-Planck-Institut für Mathematik in den Naturwissenschaften Leipzig)
2017 Andrea Mondino (University of Warwick)
2019 Maria Colombo (École Polytechnique Fédérale de Lausanne)

External links 
Bartolozzi prize on the site of the Italian Mathematical Union
Official Site of the Italian Mathematical Union (UMI)

See also

 List of mathematics awards
 List of prizes named after people

References 

Italian awards
Awards established in 1969
Awards of the Italian Mathematical Union
Awards with age limits
Biennial events